Artashes Piraghayi Kalantarian (16 September 1931 – 23 February 1991) was an Armenian writer, publicist, journalist and playwright.

Biography
Artashes Kalantarian was born in Yerevan. He graduated from faculty of philology of the Yerevan State University specializing in journalism, where he used to crack jokes with lecturers. He worked in different positions in Sovatakan Hayastan, Yerekoyan Yerevan, Grakan tert and other periodicals. From 1970 to 1982 he worked at Armenian TV. He created and hosted My home is your home popular TV-program.

He is an author of 15 books and numerous satiric articles and feuilletons, translated into Georgian, Bulgarian and Russian. His novel "Marathon" was sold out during few hours in 1969.

Personal life
He was married to Julietta Kalantaryan and had four children. He was a kind, tolerant and thoughtful person.

References

External links
Artashes Kalantarian's web site  has all of his books and many other publications, videos and audio materials
"Artashes Kalantarian plays" Android application in Armenian

1931 births
1991 deaths
Writers from Yerevan
20th-century Armenian writers
Burials in Armenia
Armenian male writers